Edidi is a town located in the Isin Local Government Area of Kwara State, Nigeria. The  Edidi town comprises three  villages:  Edidi Oja, Edidi Oke-Ona and Edidi Idera.

Demographics
Edidi people are predominantly farmers growing cash crops like kola nuts, cocoa and palm oil. They are also known to be major producers of yam, cassava, maize and various other fruit. They are subject to their king, the Eledidi of Edidi, assisted by high chiefs of several compounds.  The town comprises Christians and Muslims with both groups interacting well during the celebration of religious observances and holidays. The kingship is rotated among these three villages viz: Edidi Idera, Edidi Oke Ona and Edidi Oja in that order.

Ruler 
Edidi is currently under the rulerships Of His Royal Majesty, Oba Gabriel Kolawole Aboyeji (Aretujoye II). He is from the Aretujoye ruling families of Edidi Oja and was enthroned in December 1993.

Festivals 
Festivals in Edidi include the following :
 Akooyi Festival 
 Yam Festival 
 Edidi Day Celebration
 Ojude Oba
 One Nation on Ileya Day

References

Populated places in Kwara State
Towns in Yorubaland